Bussero is a suburban station on Line 2 of the Milan Metro in the municipality of the same name.

History
The station was opened in 1968, as a stop on the Milan-Gorgonzola fast tramway line. It was one of four stations not included in the original project (together with Cascina Burrona, Villa Fiorita and Villa Pompea). Since 4 December 1972 the section from Cascina Gobba to Gorgonzola, where this station is located, was connected to Milan Metro Line 2 and operates as part of it ever since.

Station structure 
The station has two concrete platforms, covered with translucent panels, and two tracks. The passenger building is located at the northern end of the platforms. The station is built entirely of prefabricated elements and its structure is similar to that of the stations of Cascina Burrona, Villa Fiorita and Villa Pompea, constructed at the same time.

References

Bibliography
 Giovanni Cornolò, Fuori porta in tram. Le tranvie extraurbane milanesi, Parma, Ermanno Arbertelli, 1980.
 Elio Ceron, Sergio Farné, La progettazione e la costruzione delle Linee Celeri dell'Adda, in "Ingegneria Ferroviaria", novembre 1995, pp. 1001–1022.

Line 2 (Milan Metro) stations
Railway stations opened in 1981
1981 establishments in Italy
Railway stations in Italy opened in the 20th century